Andy Atuegbu (ah-two-ay-boo) is a retired Nigerian football midfielder.  Atuegbu was a star midfielder for the University of San Francisco from 1974 to 1977.  The Dons won the NCAA championship two of Atuegbu's four seasons with the team, 1975 and 1976.  His outstanding play led to his selection as a first team All American in 1976.  He also earned second team All American recognition in 1975 and 1977. His 1976 NCAA championship with the Dons was complemented with a National Challenge Cup title while playing for SFAC. He scored the winning goal in the final against Inter-Giuliana.

The Oakland Stompers of the North American Soccer League (NASL) drafted Atuegbu in 1978 and he spent that season with the Stompers.  The team folded at the end of the 1978 season and Atuegbu moved to the Edmonton Drillers for the 1979 NASL season.  In the fall of 1979, he signed with the Hartford Hellions of the Major Indoor Soccer League.  After one season, he moved to the San Francisco Fog where he played the 1980-1981 season.  He later played for the amateur Greek-American A.C. when it won the 1985 U.S. Open Cup.

Soccer America Magazine named Atuegbu to their College Team of the Century.

While retired from professional soccer, Atuegbu continues to play for fun.

References

External links
 Recap of SFU's championship teams
 NASL/MISL stats

1952 births
Nigerian footballers
Nigerian expatriate footballers
San Francisco Dons men's soccer players
North American Soccer League (1968–1984) players
Oakland Stompers players
Edmonton Drillers (1979–1982) players
Association football midfielders
Hartford Hellions players
Major Indoor Soccer League (1978–1992) players
San Francisco Fog (MISL) players
San Francisco Greek-American A.C. players
Expatriate soccer players in Canada
Expatriate soccer players in the United States
Nigerian expatriate sportspeople in Canada
Nigerian expatriate sportspeople in the United States
Living people
All-American men's college soccer players
NCAA Division I Men's Soccer Tournament Most Outstanding Player winners
Sportspeople from Jos